Wdecki Młyn  is a settlement in the administrative district of Gmina Lubichowo, within Starogard County, Pomeranian Voivodeship, in northern Poland. The settlement has a population of 21.

Geography

See also
History of Pomerania

References

External links

Villages in Starogard County